George Raymond West (November 29, 1925 – February 17, 2016) was an American sound engineer. He won an Academy Award for Best Sound for the film Star Wars Episode IV: A New Hope. He worked on over 60 films between 1977 and 1993.

West also did extensive work in television. He was nominated for thirteen Emmy Awards and, in 1978, won an award for sound mixing for the NBC TV movie The Winds of Kitty Hawk (1978), starring Michael Moriarty, and, in 1986, for Unnatural Causes, starring John Ritter.

West died in February 2016 at the age of 90.

Selected filmography
 Star Wars Episode IV: A New Hope (1977)

References

External links

1925 births
2016 deaths
American audio engineers
Best Sound BAFTA Award winners
Best Sound Mixing Academy Award winners
Emmy Award winners